The XV Racquetball European Championships were held in Nanterre, near Paris, (France) from August 3 to 9 2009, with seven men's national teams and three women's national teams in competition. On August 6 started the individual, doubles, senior and junior competitions.  

The venue was the Forest-Hill City Form, in Nanterre, with 4 regulation racquetball courts. The 7 men's teams were Belgium, Catalonia, France, Germany, Ireland, Italy and The Netherlands and the 3 women's teams were Catalonia, Germany and Ireland. More than 50 players were in the singles, doubles, junior and senior competitions. 

The opening ceremony was on August 2 with the president of European Racquetball Federation, Erik Meyer, and the president of Paris Racquetball Association, Jean-Pierre Boudart.

Men's national teams competition

First round - August 3, 2009

Final round
August 4, 2009

Semifinals - 09:30

5th to 7th places - 09:30

5th and 6th places - 13:30

3rd and 4th places - 13:30

FINAL - 18:00

Men's teams final standings

Women's national teams competition

Women's teams final standings

Men's Single competition

Women's Single competition

Men's Doubles competition

Women's Doubles competition

See also
European Racquetball Championships

External links
Results for the teams competition ERF website
Men's singles results
Women's singles results
Men's doubkes results
Women's doubles results

European Racquetball Championships 
Racquetball
2009 in French sport
International sports competitions hosted by France
Racquetball in France